
This is a list of aircraft in alphabetical order by manufacturer which begin with "I".

I

IA 
Prefixes used by aircraft designed or manufactured at the FMA/FAdeA:
Ae, for "Dirección General de Aerotécnica", 1927–1936);
F.M.A., for "Fábrica Militar de Aviones", (1938–1943);
I.Ae., for "Instituto Aerotécnico", (1943–1952);
IA, meaning not specified, (1952–2007).

DINFIA IA 24
DINFIA IA 25 : assault glider
DINFIA IA 28 :twin-engined fighter based on IA-24 with Rolls-Royce Merlin engines.
DINFIA IA 31
DINFIA IA 32 :two-seat trainer aircraft
 DINFIA IA 35 Huanquero
 DINFIA IA 35 Type 1A
 DINFIA IA 35 Type 1U
 DINFIA IA 35 Type II
 DINFIA IA 35 Type III
 DINFIA IA 35 Type IV
 DINFIA Constancia II
 DINFIA Pandora
 DINFIA IA 35 Guaraní I
DINFIA IA 38 Naranjero
DINFIA IA 45 Querandi
DINFIA IA 46 Ranquel
FMA IA 50 Guaraní II
DINFIA IA 51 Tehuelche
DINFIA IA 53 Mamboretá
FMA IA 54 Carancho
FMA IA 58 Pucará
FMA IA 66 Pucará
FMA IA 63 Pampa

IABSA 
(Industria Aeronáutica Brasileira SA)
 IABSA Premier 64-01
 IABSA Aerobatic 65-02

IAC 
(International Aeromarine Corporation)
 IAC TA16 Seafire

IAE
(Institute of Aerospace Engineering - Vsoké Učeni Techniké Brně - (Brno University of Technology))
 IAE VUT Marabou

I.Ae. 
(Instituto Aerotécnico)
known as Ae (from "Dirección General de Aerotécnica") 1927–1936, "Fábrica Militar de Aviones" (FMA) 1938–1943, I.Ae (for "Instituto Aerotécnico") 1943–1952, and IA from 1952 to 2007.
I.Ae. 20 El Boyero
I.Ae. 21
I.Ae. 22 DL
I.Ae. 23
I.Ae. 24 Calquín
I.Ae. 25 Mañque
I.Ae. 26 D-600
I.Ae. 27 Pulqui I
I.Ae. 28 D-710
I.Ae. 29 D-720
I.Ae. 30 Ñancú (Ñamcú ?)
I.Ae. 31 Colibrí
I.Ae. 32 Chingolo
I.Ae. 33 glider 1:1 scale
I.Ae. 33 Pulqui II
I.Ae. 34 Clen Antú
I.Ae. 35 Huanquero
I.Ae. 36 Cóndor
I.Ae. 37P
I.Ae. 37
I.Ae. 38 Naranjero
I.Ae. 39
I.Ae. 40
I.Ae. 41 Urubú
I.Ae. 42
I.Ae. 43 Pulqui III
I.Ae. 44 DL II
I.Ae. 45 Querandí
I.Ae. 46 Ranquel

IAI 
(Israeli Aircraft Industries)
 IAI AMIT Fouga
 IAI Arava
 IAI Astra
 IAI C-38 Courier
 IAI Commodore Jet
 IAI F-21 Kfir
 IAI Galaxy
 IAI Harpy
 IAI Heron
 IAI 1121 Jet Commander
 IAI Kfir
 IAI Lavi
 IAI Nesher
 IAI Phalcon
 IAI Pioneer
 IAI Scout
 IAI Seascan
 IASI Shahal
 IAI Westwind
 IAI Nammer
 IAI EL/W-2085

IAMI 
(Iran Aircraft Manufacturing Industrial Company)
 IAMI Azarakhsh
 IAMI Dorna
 IAMI Iran-140
 IAMI Paratsu
 IAMI Project 2061
 IAMI Project 2091
 IAMI Shahed 274
 IAMI Shahed 278
 IAMI Shafagh
 IAMI Shavabiz
 IAMI Simorgh
 IAMI Tazarv

Iannotta 
(Orlando Iannotta later Voliamo)
 Iannotta I-66 San Francesco
 Iannotta I-66L San Francesco 2
 Iannotta I-96 San Francesco 3

IAIO
(Iran Aviation Industries Organization)
 IAIO Toofan I
 IAIO Toofan II

IAR 
(Industria Aeronautică Română)
 IAR Ag 6
 IAR CV 11
 IAR 12
 IAR 13
 IAR 14
 IAR 15
 IAR 16
 IAR 21
 IAR 22
 IAR 23
 IAR 24
 IAR 27
 IAR 36
 IAR 37
 IAR 38
 IAR 39
 IAR 46
 IAR 47
 IAR 79
 IAR 80
 IAR 81
 IAR 93 Vultur
 IAR 95
 IAR 99
 IAR 109
 IAR 316
 IAR 317
 IAR 330
 IAR 330L - Socat
 IAR 811
 IAR 813
 IAR 814
 IAR 817
 IAR 818
 IAR 821
 IAR 822
 IAR 823
 IAR 824
 IAR 825
 IAR 826
 IAR 827
 IAR 828
 IAR 831
 IAR MR-2

Iberavia
 Iberavia I-11
 Iberavia IP-2
 Iberavia IE-02

Ibis Aircraft
(Ibis Aircraft SA, Cali, Colombia)
Ibis GS-240
Ibis GS-450 Magic
Ibis GS-501 Urraco
Ibis GS-600 Arrow
Ibis GS-700 Magic
Ibis GS-710 Magic
Ibis GS-730 Super Magic
Ibis GS-750 Grand Magic

ICA-Brasov 
(Intreprinderea de Construcţii Aeronautice - Brasov)
 ICA IS-23
 ICA IS-28 "Lark"
 ICA IS-28M
 ICA IS-29
 ICA IS-30
 ICA IS-31
 ICA IS-32
 ICA IS-33

ICAR 
(Întreprinderea de Construcţii Aeronautice Româneşti)
 ICAR M.23b
 ICAR Universal Tourer
 ICAR Universal Aerobat
 ICAR Universal Trainer
 ICAR M.36 Comercial (sic)
 ICAR Acrobatic
 ICAR Turing
 ICAR 1 - Primary glider
 ICAR RO-2 - Radu Onciul
 ICAR F-10G (Fleet Model 10G)

Icaro 2000
(Sangiano, Italy)
Icaro Bip
Icaro Laminar
Icaro Mars
Icaro MastR
Icaro Orbiter
Icaro Pit-Trike
Icaro Relax
Icaro RX2
Icaro RXB
Icaro Stratos
Icaro Twin Electric

Icarus 
 Icarus Aeneas

Icarus Foundation
(Bucharest, Romania)
Icarus F99 Rambo

Ichimori 
(Yoshinori Ichimori)
 Ichimori 1919 Monocoque Aeroplane
 Ichimori Skylark
 Ichimori Tractor

Icon 
(Icon Aircraft (founders: Kirk Hawkins, Steen Strand), Los Angeles, CA)
 Icon A5

ICP srl
(Castelnuovo Don Bosco, Italy)
ICP Amigo
ICP Bingo
ICP Savannah
ICP Vimana

ICRMA 
(Intreprinderea de Reparat Material Aeronautic)
 IAR 818

Idea Aircraft
(Idea Aircraft Company, Miskolc, Hungary)
Idea Hydropteron

IFB Stuttgart 
(Universität Stuttgart - Institut für Flugzeugbau )
 e-Genius
 Icaré 2

IFIL 
(Intreprinderea Forestierǎ di Industrializare a Lemnului - Reghin)
 IFIL RM-1 - (Vladimiir Nowiţchi)
 IFIL RG-1 - (Vladimiir Nowiţchi)
 IFIL RG-2 - (Vladimiir Nowiţchi)
 IFIL RG-3 - (Vladimiir Nowiţchi)
 IFIL RG-4 Pionier - (Vladimiir Nowiţchi)
 IFIL RG-5 Pescăruş - (Vladimiir Nowiţchi)
 IFIL RG-6 - (Vladimiir Nowiţchi)

IFTHB 
(Institut für Flugzeugbau an der Technischen Hochschule Braunschweig)
 Braunschweig Zaunkönig

Iga 
(Ujihiro Iga)
 Iga Maitsuru-go

IIL 
(Întreprinderea de industrie Locală - Ghimbav)
 IIL IS-5 - Iosif Şilimon
 IIL IS-8 - Iosif Şilimon
 IIL IS-10 - Iosif Şilimon
 IIL IS-12 - Iosif Şilimon
 IIL IS-13 - Iosif Şilimon
 IIL IS-18 - Iosif Şilimon
 IIL IS-18/25 - Iosif Şilimon

IK 
(Ilmailuinsinöörien Kerho - Aeronautical Engineers Club)
 IK Viri

Ikar Aero Club
 Ikar Ai-9 Lis
 Ikar Ai-10 Ikar

Ikarus 
(Tvornica Aero i Hydroplana Ikarus - Ikarus aeroplane and hydroplane factory)
 Ikarus 211
 Ikarus 212
 Ikarus 213
 Ikarus 214
 Ikarus 215
 Ikarus 231
 Ikarus 232 Pionir
 Ikarus 251
 Ikarus 252 Prvi Maj
 Ikarus 451
 Ikarus 452
 Ikarus 453
 Ikarus P-453-MW
 Ikarus 522
 Ikarus 920
 Ikarus Aero 2
 Ikarus Aero 3
 Ikarus IK 2
 Ikarus IM - reconnaissance flying boat (1920s)
 Ikarus IO - reconnaissance flying boat (1927)
 Ikarus Košava
 Ikarus Kurir
 Ikarus Kurir H - reconnaissance and utility floatplane (1957)
 Ikarus Meteor
 Ikarus Orkan
 Ikarus Prvi maj
 Ikarus S-49
 Ikarus SM - biplane flying boat (1920s)
 Ikarus Trojka
 Ikarus MM-2

Ikarus
(Ikarus Drachen Thomas Pellicci, Stephanskirchen, Germany)
Ikarus Funflyer
Ikarus Doppel
Ikarus Duo Club
Ikarus Grasshopper
Ikarus Imagine
Ikarus Spirit L

Ikarus 
(Comco Ikarus)
 Ikarus 500
 Ikarus Sherpa
 Ikarus C22
 Ikarus C42
 Ikarus C52

Ilmailuinsinöörien Kerho 
(Club of Aeronautical Engineers)
 IK Viri

Ilyushin
 Ilyushin BSh-2
 Ilyushin DB-3
 Ilyushin DB-4
 Ilyushin I-21
 Ilyushin Il-1
 Ilyushin Il-2
 Ilyushin Il-4 (DB-3F)
 Ilyushin Il-6
 Ilyushin Il-8
 Ilyushin Il-10
 Ilyushin Il-12
 Ilyushin Il-14
 Ilyushin Il-16 (ground attack aircraft of 1945, variant of Il-10)
 Ilyushin Il-16 (jet airliner project of 1952)
 Ilyushin Il-18 (4-piston-engined transport of 1946)
 Ilyushin Il-18 (turboprop airliner of 1965)
 Ilyushin Il-20 (1948) (Heavy ground attack aircraft of 1948)
 Ilyushin Il-20 (ECM aircraft of 1978, variant of Il-18)
 Ilyushin Il-22 (1st soviet jet Bomber) "Type 10"
 Ilyushin Il-22
 Ilyushin Il-24 (4-engine jet bomber prototype of 1947)
 Ilyushin Il-24
 Ilyushin Il-26
 Ilyushin Il-28 a.k.a. "Type 27"
 Ilyushin Il-30
 Ilyushin Il-32
 Ilyushin Il-34
 Ilyushin Il-36
 Ilyushin Il-38 (Tactical Bomber project)
 Ilyushin Il-38 (ASW Patrol version of Il-18"Coot")
 Ilyushin Il-40 (1st prototype)
 Ilyushin Il-42
 Ilyushin Il-46
 Ilyushin Il-54
 Ilyushin Il-56
 Ilyushin Il-60
 Ilyushin Il-62
 Ilyushin Il-64
 Ilyushin Il-66 (supersonic airliner project 1959)
 Ilyushin Il-66 (military transport project early 1960s)
 Ilyushin Il-70 (first short-haul airliner project 1961)
 Ilyushin Il-70 (second short-haul airliner project 1961)
 Ilyushin Il-60 (AEW aircraft project 1969)
 Ilyushin Il-72 (supersonic airliner project 1961)
 Ilyushin Il-72 (medium-haul airliner project 1964)
 Ilyushin Il-74
 Ilyushin Il-76
 Ilyushin Il-78
 Ilyushin Il-80
 Ilyushin Il-82
 Ilyushin Il-86
 Ilyushin Il-88
 Ilyushin Il-90
 Ilyushin Il-96
 Ilyushin Il-100
 Ilyushin Il-102
 Ilyushin Il-103
 Ilyushin Il-106
 Ilyushin Il-108 (Abandoned project)
 Ilyushin Il-112
 Ilyushin Il-114
 Ilyushin Il-126
 Ilyushin MSh

IML Group 
 IML Addax

IMAM 
(Meridionali - IMAM - Industrie Meccaniche e Aeronautiche Meridonali)
See Meridionali

IMPA 
(Industrias Metalúrgicas y Plasticas Argentinas S.A.)
 IMPA RR-11 
 IMPA Tu-Sa-O
 IMPA Chorlito

Impuls
(Impuls Flugdrachen GmbH, Munich, Germany)
Impuls 14
Impuls 17
Impuls IC

Inagaki 
(Yasuji Inagaki)
 Inagaki Tractor

Indaer Peru
 Indaer Peru Chuspi
 Indaer Peru IAP-002 Ag-Chuspi

Independence Paragliding
(Eisenberg, Germany)
Independence Air Taxi
Independence Akron
Independence Avalon
Independence Cruiser
Independence Draco
Independence Dragon
Independence Duet
Independence Geronimo
Independence Pioneer
Independence Raptor
Independence Speed Tandem
Independence Sportster
Independence Striker
Independence T-Fighter
Independence Trainer
Independence Zippy PT

Indonesian Aerospace

Indonesian Aerospace and its precursors 
(PT Dirgantara Indonesia (DI) - (IAe) Indonesian Aerospace)

AURI 
(Angkatan Udara Republik Indonesia, Depot Penjelidikan, Pertjobaan dan Pembuatan - Indonesian Air force research, development, and production depot)
 NU-200 Sikumbang
 NU-225 Sikumbang (X-09)
 NU-260 Sikumbang (X-02)
 Belalang 85 (X-03)
 Belalang 90
 NU-25 Kunang
 Super Kunang 35 (X-05 and X-07)
 Kindjeng 150 (X-06)
 B-8m Kolentang2

LIPNUR
(Lembaga Industri Penerbangan Nurtanio - Nurtanio Aviation Industry Body)
 LIPNUR LT-200 Angkatang (Pazmany PL-2)
 LIPNUR Nu-90 Belalang
 LIPNUR Kindjeng
 LIPNUR Kolentang
 LIPNUR Kumbang
 LIPNUR Kunang-kunang
 LIPNUR Manyang
 LIPNUR Sikumbang
 LIPNUR Super Kunang I
 LIPNUR Super Kunang II

Nurtanio 
 Nurtanio Nu-200
 CASA-Nurtanio CN-235

Indonesian Aerospace 
 NC 212, a licensed production of CASA C.212 Aviocar aircraft.
 Indonesian Aerospace N-219
 Indonesian Aerospace N-2130
 Indonesian Aerospace CN-235 Civil, Military, and Maritime Version (Joint Development with CASA).
 Indonesian Aerospace N-245
 Indonesian Aerospace N-250
 NAS 330J, a licensed production of Aérospatiale Puma helicopter.
 NAS 332, a licensed production of Eurocopter Super Puma helicopter.
 NBell 412,a licensed production of Bell 412 helicopter.
 NBO 105,a licensed production of Bölkow Bo 105 helicopter.

IPTN 
(Industri Pesawat Terbang Nusantara  or Industri Pesawat Terbang Nurtanio)
 IPTN C-212
 IPTN CN-235
 IPTN N-250
 IPTN N-2130
 IPTN NAS-330 J
 IPTN NAS-332
 IPTN NBell-412
 IPTN NBO-105

Indraéro
(Sociétè Indraéro)
 Indraéro Aéro 101
 Indraéro Aéro 110
 Indraéro Aéro 20
 Indraéro Aéro 30

Indy Aircraft
(Indy Aircraft Limited, Independence, IA)
Indy T-Bird I
Indy T-Bird II

Infinity Power Chutes
(Bronson, Michigan)
Infinity Challenger
Infinity Commander
Infinity Purple

Ingam-foster 
(Texas Aeroplane Co (founders: Jay Ingram, Charles A Foster), Decatur, TX)
 Ingam-Foster 1914 Biplane

Inland
(Inland Aviation Co (Pres: Arthur Hardgrave), 14 St and Minnesota Ave, Kansas City, KS)
 Inland S-100 (55 hp Velie M-5 engine)
 Inland S-200 (55 hp Velie M-5 engine)
 Inland S-300 Sport (65 hpLe Blond 5D engine)
 Inland R-400 Sportster (90 hp Warner engine)
 Inland S-400 (110 hp Warner Scarab engine)
 Inland W-500 Super Sport (110 hp Warner Scarab engine)
 Inland W-600 Super Sport (145 hp Warner Scarab engine)
 Inland T (145 hp Warner Scarab engine)

Innovator
(Innovator Technologies)
 Innovator Mosquito Air

Insitu
 Insitu Aerosonde
 Insitu GeoRanger
 Insitu Insight
 Boeing ScanEagle - In Partnership with Boeing
 Insitu NightEagle
 Insitu Integrator On July 30, 2010 it was reported that Insitu won the STUAS Tier II contract with its Integrator product.

INTA 
(Instituto Nacional de Tecnica Aeronautica - national institute of aeronautics)
 INTA HM.1
 INTA HM.2
 INTA HM.3
 INTA HM.5
 INTA HM.7
 INTA HM.9

Interavia 
(Interavia Konstruktorskoye Buro AO — Russia)
 Interavia I-1
 Interavia CR-90
 Interavia I-3
 Interavia SP-91
 Interavia I-5

Interceptor
(1968: Interceptor Corp, Norman, OK, c. 1973: Interceptor Co, Boulder, CO)
 Interceptor 400

International
(International Aircraft Corp organized from Catron & Fisk, Santa Monica, CA)
 International F-10 Triplane (a.k.a. CF-10 Triplane)
 International F-16 Violet
 International F-17 Sportsman
 International F-18 Air Coach

International
(International Aircraft Corp organized from Catron & Fisk, Santa Monica CA)
 International Duckling

International Helicopters
 International Helicopters Commuter II

International Ultralight 
(International Ultralight Aviation)
 International Ultralight Banchee

InterPlane
(InterPlane Aircraft sro, Zbraslavice, Czech Republic)
 InterPlane Griffon
 InterPlane Skyboy
 InterPlane Starboy
 InterPlane ZJ-Viera

Interstate 
(Interstate Aircraft Company)
 Interstate Arctic Tern

Interstate 
(Interstate Aircraft & Engineering Corp (Pres: Donald White), El Segundo, CA)
Cadet airplanes:
 Interstate S-1 Cadet (modern production as the Arctic Tern)
 Interstate L-6 Cadet
 Interstate L-8 Cadet
 Interstate O-63 Cadet
TDR drones:
 Interstate BQ-6A
 Interstate TDR-1 (main production run)
 Interstate TD3R-1
 Interstate XTDR-1
 Interstate XTD2R-1
 Interstate XTD3R-1
 Interstate XTD3R-2
 Interstate XBQ-4
 Interstate XBQ-5
 Interstate XBQ-6
XBDR jet-powered drone:
 Interstate XBDR

Invincible 
(Invincible Metal Furniture Co, Aircraft Div (Pres: John A Schuette), Manitowoc, WI)
 Invincible 1929 Monoplane
 Invincible 200
 Invincible Center-Wing
 Invincible D-D

Iomax
 Iomax ArchAngel

Ion
(Ion Aircraft)
 Ion Aircraft Ion
 Ion Aircraft Ion 100
 Ion Aircraft Ion 105
 Ion Aircraft Ion 120

IPAI 
(Instituto de Pesquisas AI - Industrial Development and Research Institute (University of São Paulo))
 IPAI-26 Tuca</ref>
 IPAI-27 Jipe Vaodor
 IPAI-28 Super Surubim
 IPAI-29 Tira Prosa
 IPAI-30

IPD 
(Instituto de Pesquisas e Desenvolvimento English:Research and Development Institute (University of São Paulo))
 IPD-6504
 I.P.D BF-1 Beija-Flor

IPE
(Industria Paranaense de Estruturas)
 IPE 04
 IPE 06 Curucaca

IPT 
(Instituto de Pesquisas Technologicas de Sao Paulo (University of São Paulo) includes gliders)
 IPT-0 Bichinho
 IPT-01 Gafanhoto
 IPT-02 Aratinga
 IPT-03 Saracura
 IPT-4 Planalto
 IPT-05 Jaraguá
 IPT-06 Stratus
 IPT-7 Junior
 IPT-8
 IPT-9
 IPT-10 Junior
 IPT-11 Bichão
 IPT-12 Caboré
 IPT-13
 IPT-14
 IPT-15
 IPT-16 Surubim
 IPT-17

Irbitis 
(Karlis Irbitis)
Data from:
 Irbitis Gambija - K.Irbitis (for N.Pulins)
 Irbitis-Backman I.4 Vanadzins - K.Irbitis / A.S.Christine Backman
 Irbitis I-1
 Irbitis I-2
 Irbitis I-4
 Irbitis I-5 Ikars II
 Irbitis I-6 Gambija
 Irbitis I-7 Zilais Putns
 Irbitis I-8 Zilais Putns II - N.Pulins / K. Irbitis
 Irbitis I-9 Vanags / Valsts Daugavpils Arodskola
 Irbitis I-12 – K. Irbitis - 2-seater, later converted to single-seater
 Irbitis I-14
 Irbitis I-15a
 Irbitis I-15b
 Irbitis I-16
 Irbitis I-17
 Pulins-Irbitis P.2 Spriditis (I.1) – N.Pulins & K.Irbitis
 Pulins-Irbitis P.3 Ikars (I.2) – N.Pulins & K.Irbitis

Ireland 
((G Sumner) Ireland Aircraft Inc, Curtiss Field, Garden City NY)
 Ireland Amphibion
 Ireland Amphiplane
 Ireland Comet (a.k.a. Curtiss-Ireland Comet)
 Ireland Meteor
 Ireland N-1B Neptune
 Ireland N-2B Neptune
 Ireland N-2C Neptune
 Ireland N-2D Neptune
 Ireland ND-5
 Ireland ND-6
 Ireland P-1
 Ireland P-2 Privateer
 Ireland P-3 Privateer

IRI
(Italian Rotors Industries)
 IRI T250A
 IRI T22B

Irkut 
(Irkut Corporation)
 Irkut MC-21
 Irkut A-002
 Irkut 111

IRGC
(Iranian Revolutionary Guard Corps)
 IRGC Shahed 274

IRMA 
(Intreprinderea de Reparat Material Aeronautic)
 IAR 818H
 IAR 821
 IAR 822
 IRMA BN-2 Islander

Irwin 
(Irwin Aircraft Co, 126 O St, Sacramento, CA)
 Irwin 44
 Irwin C-C-1 Meteorplane
 Irwin C-C-2 Meteorplane
 Irwin FA-1 Meteorplane
 Irwin Gray Eagle
 Irwin LW-3
 Irwin M-T Meteorplane
 Irwin M-T-1
 Irwin M-T-2 (a.k.a. SP-1)

Irwin 
(Gus Irwin (or Irvin?), 507 S Russell, Pampa, TX)
 Irwin 1931 Monoplane

Isaac
(Archibald C. J. Isaac, Pittsfield, MA)
 Isaac 1926 monoplane

Isaacs
John O. Isaacs, United Kingdom
 Isaacs Fury
 Isaacs Fury II
 Isaacs Spitfire

Isaacson 
 Isaacson 104

Isacco 
(Vittorio Isacco)
 Isacco I-1 Helicogyr
 Isacco I-2 Helicogyr
 Isacco-Saunders I-3 Helicogyr
 Isacco I-4 Helicogyr

ISAE 
(Integrated Systems Aero Engineering (Pres: Brent Brown), UT)
 IASE Omega 2

Ishibashi 
(Katsunami Ishibashi)
 Ishibashi SPAD XIII Racing Aircraft

Ishikawajima 
(KK Ishikawajima Hikoki Seisakusho - Ishikawajima Aeroplane manufacturing Co. Ltd.)
 Ishikawajima T-2 Experimental Reconnaissance Aircraft
 Ishikawajima T-3 Experimental Reconnaissance Aircraft
 Ishikawajima CM-1 Experimental Trainer
 Ishikawajima R-1 Experimental Trainer Red Dragonfly
 Ishikawajima R-2 Experimental Trainer
 Ishikawajima R-3 Trainer
 Ishikawajima R-5 Experimental Trainer

Island 
(Island Aircraft Corp (Pres: LeRoy LoPresti), no location.)
 Island X-199 Spectra

Isobe 
(Onokichi Isobe)
 Isobe 1910 Seaplane
 Isobe No.2
 Isobe Rumpler Taube

ISON
 ISON Airbike

Israel 
(Gordon Israel, Los Angeles, CA)
 Israel Redhead

Issoire
Issoire Aviation, France
 Issoire APM 20 Lionceau
 Issoire APM 30 Lion
 Issoire APM 40 Simba

Issoudun 
(Issoudun Aircraft Corp, Northville, MI)
 Issoudun H-23

IST
(Philippines Institute of Science and Technology)
 I.S.T. L-10 Balang
 I.S.T. XL-14 Maya
 I.S.T. XL-15 Tagak
 I.S.T. L-17 Musang
 I.S.T. L-21S Flying Vinta

Istra 
(Istra Experimental Mechanics Depot)
 Istra Ezhik

ITA
(Instituto Tecnològicas Aeronáutica)
 ITA Panelinha

Italair
 Italair F.20 Pegaso

ITBA 
(Aeroitba, Instituto Tecnológico de Buenos Aires, ITBA)
 Petrel 912i

Itoh 
(Itoh Aeroplane Research Studio)
 Itoh Emi 1
 Itoh Emi 2
 Itoh Emi 3
 Itoh Emi 5
 Itoh Emi 6
 Itoh Emi 9
 Itoh Emi 11 Ground Taxi-ing Trainer]]
 Itoh Emi 12 Trainer
 Itoh Emi 13 Trainer
 Itoh Emi 14 Long-range Aeroplane
 Itoh Emi 16 Racing Aeroplane
 Itoh Emi 17 Tsurubane Aerobatic Aeroplane
 Itoh Emi 18
 Itoh Emi 19 
 Itoh Emi 20
 Itoh Emi 22 Yamagatakinen-go Long-range Aeroplane
 Itoh Emi 23 Bulldog Trainer
 Itoh Emi 24 Akita-go Long-range Aeroplane
 Itoh Emi 25 Trainer
 Itoh Emi 28 Flying Boat
 Itoh Emi 29
 Itoh Emi 30
 Itoh Emi 31 Flying Boat
 Itoh Emi 50 Sport Aeroplane
 Itoh Tsurubane No.1
 Itoh Tsurubane No.2 Aerobatic Aeroplane

ITV Parapentes
(Épagny, Haute-Savoie, France)
ITV Asterion
ITV Awak
ITV Billy
ITV Bip Bip
ITV Boxer
ITV Bulldog
ITV Dakota
ITV Diamant
ITV Dolpo
ITV Fury
ITV Jedi
ITV Meteor
ITV Opale
ITV Papoose
ITV Pawnee
ITV Polaris
ITV Proxima
ITV Shakra
ITV Siam
ITV Stewart Tandem
ITV Tepee
ITV Thanka
ITV Tomahawk
ITV Tsampa
ITV Turquoise
ITV Vega

Istra 
 Istra Ezhik

Ivanov Aero
(Hradec Králové, Czech Republic)
Ivanov ZJ-Viera

IVL 
(Ilmailuvoimien Lentokonetehdas- Air Force Aircraft Factory)
 IVL A.22 Hansa
 IVL C.24
 IVL C.VI.25
 IVL D.26 Haukka I
 IVL D.27 Haukka II
 IVL K.1 Kurki
 IVL E.30 Kotka
 Caudron C.60

Izaki 
(Shozo Izaki / Sempu Hiko gakko - Sempu flying School)
 Izaki No.2 Sempu-go

References

Further reading

External links

 List of aircraft (I-M)